Tokyo Xtreme Racer: Drift (known as Kaidō Battle: Nikko, Haruna, Rokko, Hakone in Japan) is the third racing game published by Crave Entertainment for the PlayStation 2. It is the fourth main installment in Shutokō Battle series. The game allows racing at both day and night. Daytime offers the opportunity to enter competitions and gain money, while night time is where the player can race against rivals to gain respect.

Sammy Corporation was originally going to publish the US version of the game as Drift Racer: Kaido Battle, but was delayed until Crave Entertainment released it in 2006.

Gameplay

Story
The player controls Hiroki Koukami, a wanderer driver. He is able to defeat every rival and challenges every Slashers from Hakone, Haruna, Nikko, Omote Rokko and Irohazaka. After he beats Speed King, Iroha's Uphill's Slasher, he challenges Hamagaki, aka Kaido President, who drives a yellow Pantera GTS (black Acura NSX-R in US Version) and holds the title of "Emotional King". As he defeats him, he takes his title, become the new Emotional King, while Hamagaki lost it and becomes a merely Trickster.

The game was set between Zero and 3, according to the Japanese series timeline.

Cars
The game, like any in the series, included the Japanese and imported foreign cars. The foreign cars included Alfa Romeo, Mini, Lotus, DeTomaso, and Volkswagen, depending on versions. Honda was licensed in this game but not available in Tokyo Xtreme Racer 3, due to the licensing issues. Ford, Lotus and DeTomaso were removed in the 2006 US release, and Alfa Romeo and Audi from Kaido Battle 2: Chain Reaction were added in, even though Kaido Battle 2 never had a North American release.

Mountain courses
The five mountain courses were featured in this game:
Hakone
Haruna
Iroha B (Nikko)
Front Rokko/Omote Rokko
Iroha A (Irohazaka)

Reception

The game was met with mixed reception upon release, as GameRankings gave it a score of 62%, while Metacritic gave it 59 out of 100.

References

External links

2003 video games
Tokyo Xtreme Racer
Crave Entertainment games
Genki (company) games
PlayStation 2 games
PlayStation 2-only games
Multiplayer and single-player video games
Video games developed in Japan